Dear Diary is Bonnie Pink's eleventh studio album released under the Warner Music Japan label on October 6, 2010. The deluxe edition came in a cardboard foldout sleeve and included a second CD of b-sides entitled "Bonnie Pink B-side collection (1996-2009)" and a DVD of a live performance titled "DVD Tour 2009 “ONE” Final at Akasaka BLITZ (July 31, 2009, Tokyo)".

Track listing

2010 albums
Bonnie Pink albums
Albums recorded at Akasaka Blitz
Warner Music Japan albums